This Is My Life  is a 1952 Argentine film directed by Román Viñoly Barreto.

Cast
  Miguel de Molina
  Diana Maggi
  Maruja Montes
  Fidel Pintos
  Adolfo Stray
  Argentinita Vélez
  Salvador Fortuna
  Gloria Ferrandiz
  Susana Vargas
  Liana Noda
  Inés de Tolosa
  Tito Blanco
  Egle Martin
  Chela Ríos
  Tato Bores
  Claudio Martino
  Juan Villarreal
  Rafael Diserio

References

External links
 

1952 films
1950s Spanish-language films
Argentine black-and-white films
Films directed by Román Viñoly Barreto
Argentine musical drama films
1950s musical drama films
1950s Argentine films